Oszkár Demján (28 December 1891 – 4 September 1914) was a Hungarian breaststroke swimmer who competed in the 1912 Summer Olympics. In 1912 he was eliminated in the semi-finals of the 200 metre breaststroke event. In the 400 metre breaststroke competition he was disqualified, because he touched the wall with only one hand at the second turn.

He was born in Budapest and killed in action in Sianky, during World War I.

See also
 List of Olympians killed in World War I

References

1891 births
1914 deaths
Hungarian male swimmers
Male breaststroke swimmers
Olympic swimmers of Hungary
Swimmers at the 1912 Summer Olympics
Austro-Hungarian military personnel killed in World War I
Swimmers from Budapest